Arroyo Naranjo is one of the 15 municipalities or boroughs (municipios in Spanish) in the city of Havana, Cuba.  It became part of Havana city while the capital grew.

The Managua Military Airport is located in the southern part of this municipality.

History
The borough was founded in 1845, and by 1848 its party was created. In 1858 Arroyo Naranjo had 291 inhabitants, who were increasing in the period of the baths, for the proximity to the medicinal waters known by the Cacahual. Arroyo Naranjo had always a progressive population. From 291 inhabitants of 1858,  in 1871 the town had 1,485.

In 1939, famed painter Carlos Enriquez bought a small ranch house in Arroyo Naranjo, dubbed "El Huron Azul" (the Blue Ferret), which became a meeting-place for Cuba's avant-garde artists, and is now a museum dedicated to Enriquez' work.

Demographics
In 2004, the municipality of Arroyo Naranjo had a population of 210,053.

See also
List of cities in Cuba
Municipalities of Cuba

References

External links

Populated places established in 1845
Municipalities of Havana